Juggernaut Rides '89–'98 is a two-disc anthology of 33 Swervedriver songs, including 16 non-album tracks.  Eight of these later appeared as bonus tracks on the 2008/2009 "Remastered and Expanded" editions of the first three Swervedriver albums.

Track listing

Personnel
 Adam Franklin – guitars, vocals, bass
 Graham Franklin – vocals
 Jimmy Hartridge – guitar, vocals, bass
 Adi Vines – bass
 Paddy Pulzer – drums
 Graham Bonner – drums
 Jez Hindmarsh – drums
 Steve George – bass, vocals

References

Sources 
 Swervedriver discography
 Newspost dated 2-21-05
 Swervedriver - Juggernaut Rides '89-'98
 [ Allmusic]
 Amazon.co.uk

Swervedriver albums
2005 compilation albums